Blocco Mentale were an Italian progressive rock band. The band, formed in 1972 in Viterbo, only released one album called POA in 1973 and one further single before breaking up.

Personnel
 Bernardo "Dino" Finocchi (vocals, sax, flute)
 Aldo Angeletti (vocals, bass)
 Gigi Bianchi (guitar, vocals)
 Filippo Lazzari (keyboards, vocals, mouth harp)
 Michele Arena (drums, vocals)

Discography

Albums
1973: POA (Titania)

Singles
1973: L'amore muore a vent'anni (West Side)
1973: Lei è musica (West Side)

Further reading 
 Italian prog website - Contains Alusa Fallax history, pictures, discography and interview.

References 

Italian progressive rock groups